KACQ (101.9 FM) is a radio station broadcasting a country music format. It is licensed to Lometa, Texas, United States, and is owned by Debra L. Witcher and features programming from Jones Radio Network.

References

External links

ACQ